The Berlage Institute was an independent unaccredited postgraduate school of architecture in Amsterdam and Rotterdam, the Netherlands, that operated in 1990-2012. Named after the Dutch architect Hendrik Petrus Berlage, the Berlage Institute had an international student population and teaching staff.

In 2012 the institute moved to Delft University of Technology in the Netherlands, and was reestablished as The Berlage Center for Advanced Studies in Architecture and Urban Design.

1990–2012
The school was founded by Dutch architect Herman Hertzberger, who also served as the first dean. At that time, the school was located in Aldo van Eyck's Children's Orphanage in Amsterdam. Later, the institute moved to Rotterdam.

In 1995, Wiel Arets was appointed dean, drastically restructuring the school to a research-based institute. While dean, Arets initiated the school's publication, HUNCH, which was originally edited by Jennifer Sigler, editor of Rem Koolhaas' S,M,L,XL. Arets expanded the school's international prominence through the publication of HUNCH, extensive global study trips, public lectures, and notion of the 'year theme', with the 2001-2002 theme of 'Double Dutch' researching the doubling of the Netherlands' population. Architectural debate was fostered with prominently known architects, lecturers, and guest-professors, such as Zaha Hadid, Rem Koolhaas, Stan Allen, Kazuyo Sejima, Jean Nouvel, Kenneth Frampton, Tadao Ando, and Toyo Ito.

Notable alumni include Daan Roosegaarde, Miguel Robles-Durán, Vasa J. Perović, Reinier de Graaf, Ana Dzokic and Bas Princen, Mika Cimolini.

Arets stepped down in 2002, and was succeeded by Spanish architect Alejandro Zaera-Polo (2002-2005).

The Croatian architect and educator Vedran Mimica was the last director. Due to the Netherlands' government funding cuts, the Berlage Institute was forced to dissolve its existence as of 1 August 2012.

2012–Present
In autumn of 2012, the institute was re-established as 'The Berlage Center for Advanced Studies in Architecture and Urban Design', or 'The Berlage', as it now refers to itself, and is based at the Faculty of Architecture at the Delft University of Technology in the Netherlands. The current director is Salomon Frausto,
Since 2014, the organization is able to award accredited master degrees due to its affiliation with the TU Delft, whereas this was previously not the case.

References

External links 
 The Berlage Institute

Education in Amsterdam
Education in Rotterdam
Universities in the Netherlands
Architecture schools